REDjet Caribbean Ltd., operating as REDjet (Airone Caribbean/Airone Ventures Limited), was a startup low-cost carrier (LCC) based at the Grantley Adams International Airport in Christ Church, Barbados, near Bridgetown. The privately owned airline, incorporated in Barbados featured a fleet of McDonnell Douglas MD-82 and MD-83 aircraft.

Initially the airline sought to startup operations from Kingston's Norman Manley International Airport, however, the airline shifted its hub to Barbados after being denied permission to set up in Jamaica by the Jamaican Government. Since that time, REDjet's CEO has announced that he would again be seeking to have a larger airline company based-in Jamaica.

Operations commenced on May 10, 2011. The airline began marketing tickets on April 13, 2011.

On the night of March 16, 2012, the airline suspended all its services because of financial trouble. It hoped to receive government subsidies to restart the service.

On June 8, 2012, Redjet announced its closure.

History
The idea of starting REDjet first came about in 2006 when airlines in the Caribbean often charged high fares for flights, and company decided to start a low-cost airline to serve the region.

In 2010, a private sector envoy announced an intention to base a start-up airline at the Grantley Adams International Airport.  The name of the parent company is AIRONE Holdings Limited (AVL), and the air venture will seek to form "the Caribbean's first low-cost carrier". The envoy had initially attempted to begin operations from Jamaica however, Jamaican aviation authorities reportedly rejected their application for licenses. Following this, the envoy shifted focus basing operations from Barbados. On October 16, 2010, Airone Holdings Ltd. launched their airline brand REDjet, at the Sir Lloyd Erskine Sandiford Conference and Culture Centre formerly known as Sherbourne Centre. On December 10, the airline's first (of two) introductory McDonnell Douglas MD-82 aircraft named 'Jacqualicious' after an employee, was delivered to REDjet at the Grantley Adams International Airport. On February 1, 2011, REDjet's second aircraft 'Hey Jude' was delivered to REDjet at the Grantley Adams International Airport. On the same day Business Development Manager, Robbie Burns, announced that the airline was itching to start selling tickets and get into the air, stating that the airline had already invested over 1 million USD into crew and staff hiring and training. REDjet has also concluded the purchase of their third aircraft to be delivered in late November early December. The airline has named the aircraft "Nickitastic".

On April 12, 2011, the FAA announced that Barbados failed to meet regulation standards which would prevent Barbados-based airlines (including REDjet) from flying to the US.

On July 18, 2011, REDjet commences service between Barbados and Trinidad. Jamaica swiftly followed Trinidad and Tobago in granting clearance to the Barbados-based low-cost carrier. Operations began in October 2011. 

On July 27, 2011, REDjet confirmed its plans to expand its operations to other Caribbean destinations in light of an announcement that the airline had gained approval to land in St Kitts (St.Christopher) and Nevis by its Prime Minister Dr. Denzil Douglas. 

On August 5, 2011, REDjet scheduled to begin flights into St Lucia from as early as October 2011 by St. Lucian Tourism and Civil Aviation Minister Senator Allen Chastanet. After considerable delays, final government approval was awarded by the Barbados government in November 2011. Flights to St. Lucia commence on December 17, 2011.  

On August 9, 2011, REDjet, announced it was expanding its service to Antigua and began selling tickets for flights between Trinidad and Guyana, just days after securing licences under the terms of a bilateral 'open-skies' air services agreement. The Antiguan authorities have granted REDjet permission to begin flights to St John’s. The airline plans to inaugurate a direct Antigua-Guyana route by late November. 

On March 16, 2012, REDjet suspended all flights at 23:59 after coming into financial difficulties. The collapse of the airline was announced over social networking by the airlines CEO.

Destinations

REDjet served the following scheduled destinations :

Fleet details

The REDjet fleet consisted of MD-80 series aircraft (acquired from American Airlines) in a 149-seat all economy configuration.

References

External links

Route map

Defunct airlines of Barbados
Airlines established in 2010
Airlines disestablished in 2012
Defunct low-cost airlines
2010 establishments in Barbados
2012 disestablishments in Barbados